Bridge in West Fallowfield Township is a historic steel Pratt pony truss bridge located in West Fallowfield Township, Chester County, Pennsylvania. It spans Octoraro Creek.  It has a single span, .  The bridge was constructed in 1885, by the Phoenix Bridge Company, Phoenixville, Pennsylvania.

It was listed on the National Register of Historic Places in 1988.

References 
 

Road bridges on the National Register of Historic Places in Pennsylvania
Bridges completed in 1885
Bridges in Chester County, Pennsylvania
National Register of Historic Places in Chester County, Pennsylvania
Steel bridges in the United States
Pratt truss bridges in the United States